Mardi Gras is a Cowboy Mouth EP that was released in coordination with the band's 16th Annual Rock N' Roll Mardi Gras Tour.  The album is composed of Mardi Gras themed music and an acoustic version of a song from the band's 2006 album Voodoo Shoppe.

Track listing
 "Iko Iko" (James "Sugar Boy" Crawford) - 2:38 
 "Hurry Up and Know It / Make You Love Me" (Ernie K-Doe) - 2:46
 "Go to the Mardi Gras" (Professor Longhair) - 2:03
 "Carnival Time" (Al Johnson) - 2:22
 "The Avenue" (Acoustic) (Fred LeBlanc, John Thomas Griffith, Paul Sanchez) - 4:18

Personnel
Cowboy Mouth
 Fred LeBlanc 
 John Thomas Griffith 
 Casandra Faulconer
 Matt Jones
with:
The Bonerama Horns 
Mark Mullins
Craig Klein
Greg Hicks

References

2010 debut EPs
Cowboy Mouth albums
Valley Entertainment EPs